The 15th Actors and Actresses Union Awards ceremony was held on 29 May 2006 at Madrid's Palacio de Congresos. The gala was directed by Juan Margallo.

In addition to the competitive awards,  obtained the '' life achievement career award, whilst the Special Award went to Círculo de Bellas Artes. The platform Ahotsak won the 'Mujeres en Unión' award.

Winners and nominees 
The winners and nominees are listed as follows:

Film

Television

Theatre

Newcomers

References 

Actors and Actresses Union Awards
2006 in Madrid
2006 television awards
2006 film awards
2006 theatre awards
May 2006 events in Europe